The Distribuidor Vial San Antonio is a Mexican freeway located at the west side of Mexico City.
It was built under the mandate of the previous head of government, Andrés Manuel López Obrador between 2002 and May 14, 2006.
It is part of a network of second levels in the city's freeway system, colloquially called "Segundo piso" ("second floor"), built to improve traffic circulation.

Main purposes
The main purpose of the Distribuidor Vial San Antonio is to solve traffic jams in the following avenues and roads:
Anillo Periferico Sur (Exterior Circuit)
Eje 5 Sur San Antonio (Main route 5 South)
Eje 10 Sur San Jerónimo (Main route 10 South)
Revolución (Interior Circuit)
Viaducto Río Becerra (Viaducto Miguel Alemán)
Eje 6 Sur Holbein (Main route 6 South)
Las Flores
Barranca del Muerto
Rómulo O'Farrill

Names
The Distribuidor Vial is named after the streets it crosses:

San Antonio (East-South)(San Antonio Av.-Lomas de Plateros)
San Jerónimo (South-East) (San Jerónimo Av.-Lomas de Plateros)
Las Torres (South-East) (Las Torres Av.-San Antonio Av.)
Las Flores (North-South) (Las Flores Av.-San Jerónimo Av.)

Incidents
A riot broke out at the overpass after police beat protesters during a demonstration by cyclists who were upset after a Metrobús ran over a bicyclist. Eleven police officers were arrested.

References

Highways in Greater Mexico City